Bardello con Malgesso e Bregano is a town and comune located in the province of Varese, in the Lombardy region of northern Italy. It was established on 1 January 2023 from the merger of Bardello, Malgesso and Bregano.

Geography

History
The municipality was created on 1 January 2023 with the merger of the previously independent municipalities of Bardello, Bregano and Malgesso. The citizens of the three municipalities had previously approved the merger in February 2022 and the regional council of Lombardy in October 2022.

References

Cities and towns in Lombardy
2023 establishments in Italy